Horace Robert Milan (April 7, 1894 – June 29, 1955), was an American professional baseball outfielder who played from  to . He appeared in 42 total games in Major League Baseball during  and  trials with the Washington Senators, where his elder brother Clyde was a teammate.

In his 42-game MLB career, Milan collected 32 hits, including four doubles and two triples; he drove in 16 runs. He also stole six bases in part-time duty.

Milan scouted for the Washington organization after his playing career.

External links

1894 births
1955 deaths
Baseball players from Tennessee
Bridgeport Bears (baseball) players
Des Moines Boosters players
Harrisburg Senators players
Major League Baseball outfielders
McAlester Miners players
Minneapolis Millers (baseball) players
Newark Indians players
New Haven Profs players
Norfolk Tars players
Oklahoma City Indians players
People from Perry County, Tennessee
Pittsfield Hillies players
Rochester Hustlers players
Sherman Hitters players
Sioux City Packers players
Texarkana Tigers players
Washington Senators (1901–1960) players
Washington Senators (1901–60) scouts